Periodic deposit is the investment made in form of equal deposits over a time period regularly. Each deposit recurs after a time interval. Such an investment is made to achieve a pre-planned financial objective and/or when the capital to invest is less.

In simpler words, periodic deposit is a deposit recurring on a periodic basis. Investment is made over the period, grows over the period and matures at the end of the period.

Real world example 

John is planning investment for his retirement. He has decided to invest an amount of US$150.00 per pay check over a period of 30 years. He receives his pay check twice every month. The interest rate expected is 10% per annum with quarterly compounding.

Investment

*All deposits made at start of the period

Returns

See also
 Finance
 Interest
 Rate of return on investment
 Real interest rate
 Single deposit

References

Investment